Justine Hodder (born 10 March 1972) is an Australia former professional tennis player.

Tennis career
Hodder and Nicole Pratt were runners-up in the junior doubles final at the 1990 Australian Open. Hodder received a wildcard into the women's singles main draw, where she was beaten in the first round by 13th seed Raffaella Reggi.

As a professional player, she was most successful in doubles, with a best ranking of 113 and eight ITF titles. In both 1990 and 1993, she made the second round of the women's doubles at the Australian Open, and she also featured in the main draws at the French Open and Wimbledon.

ITF finals

Doubles: 18 (8–10)

References

External links
 
 

1972 births
Living people
Australian female tennis players
20th-century Australian women